Hindu religion and culture in Singapore can be traced to the 7th century AD, when Temasek was a trading post of Hindu-Buddhist Srivijaya empire. A millennium later, a wave of immigrants from southern India were brought to Singapore, mostly as coolies and indentured labourers by the British East India Company and colonial British Empire. As with Malay peninsula, the British administration sought to stabilise a reliable labour force in its regional plantation and trading activities; it encouraged Hindus to bring family through the kangani system of migration, settle, build temples and segregated it into a community that later became Little India.

There are currently about thirty main Hindu temples in Singapore. There were an estimated 172,963 Hindus in Singapore according to the 2020 Census constituting 5.0% of the Singapore's population. Almost all Hindus in Singapore are ethnic Indians (99%), with some who have married into Hindu families. Hinduism peaked at 5.5% of the total population in 1931.

In Singapore, the Hindu festival of Deepavali is recognised as a national public holiday. Some non-Indians, usually Buddhist Chinese, participate in various Hindu activities. Unlike various states of Malaysia and Indonesia, Singapore places no restrictions on religious freedoms of Hindus.

Demographics 

Population of resident ethnic group registered as Hindus 2020. The proportion of Indians following Islam, Christianity and  Buddhism are relatively higher as the  Singaporean Census calculate Pakistanis, Bangladeshis, Sri Lankan etc under ethnic Indian Category. 

Population of resident ethnic group registered as Hindus 2015.

History

Hindu religion and culture in Singapore can be traced back to the 7th century Hindu Srivijaya empire when Temasek was a small trading post. By the 10th century, Tamil Chola influence arrived. With Islam's expansion in the region from 14th through 17th century, the Hindu-Buddhist influence, in and around Singapore, faded. The colonial era brought major changes in the seats of power and religious influence in the region.

The early 19th century saw a wave of Hindu immigrants to Singapore from southern India, mostly Tamils, brought in to work as coolies and labourers by the British East India Company in Singapore. These immigrants brought along their religion and culture. Their arrival saw the building of temples throughout the island in the Dravidian form of architecture, and the beginnings of a vibrant Hindu culture.

Though the labourers were mostly responsible for introducing and preserving their religion in their new home, in later times, monetary contributions were made by the richer Hindu merchants to build up the makeshift shacks that served as their place of worship. The temples also served to hold the community together, being a source of comfort to those far away in a foreign land.

The first Hindu temple 

The first verifiable temple, Sri Mariamman Temple in Chinatown, was built as early as 1827 by Narayana Pillai, a clerk to Sir Stamford Raffles; it was dedicated to the Hindu goddess Mariamman, an incarnation of the Mother Goddess. He first erected a wooden, thatched hut on this site that he had purchased in 1823. The present temple was completed by 1863.

Architecture
The Hindu temples of Singapore are built in the Dravidian style, mainly the Tamil style found in Tamil Nadu, India. This style is known for its imposing 'gopurams' or entrance towers, complex friezes, intricate carvings and paintings or murals done on the walls and ceilings.

Modern day
Two government bodies deal with all Hindu affairs — The Hindu Endowments Board and the Hindu Advisory Board.

There are currently about thirty main temples in Singapore, dedicated to various gods and goddesses from the Hindu pantheon. 

Hindus make up a minority, comprising about 5.1% (2010 Census) of adult Singapore citizens and permanent residents. Among 15 years or older population, there were about 158,000 Hindus according to Singapore's 2010 Census; 37% of all Hindus in Singapore speak Tamil at home, while another 42% speak English. Vast majority of Hindus in Singapore are ethnic South Indians. The small numbers of non-Indian Hindus are mainly Chinese and Malay women who were adopted by or married into Hindu families.

There are 3 Hindu temples which are gazetted as national monuments of Singapore. The Sri Mariamman Temple was the first Hindu temple to become a national monument in 1973, the Sri Srinivasa Perumal Temple in 1978 and the Sri Thendayuthapani Temple in 2014.

Different communities have also established their own temples in Singapore. For instance, the Sri Lankan Tamil community established the Sri Senpaga Vinayagar Temple at Ceylon Road and the Chettiar community set up the Sri Thandayuthapani Temple at Tank Road. The North Indian community also established the Sri Lakshminarayan Temple, built in the North Indian style.

In Singapore a number of non-Indians, such as Buddhist Chinese, participate in a variety of Hindu activities, including praying to Hindu deities, donating money to the temple funds and participating in Hindu festivals like Deepavali, the fire-walking ceremony, and Thaipusam. Certain temples, such as the Sri Krishnan Temple in Waterloo Street, or some Hindu temples in Yishun have also built up substantial followers among the Chinese community, who often visit these temples on their way to or from visiting nearby Chinese temples.

Hindu religious festivals

Some of the major Hindu festivals celebrated every year include Deepavali (Diwali), Thaipusam, Pongal, Tamil New Year or Varuda Pirappu, Holi also known as Festival of Colours and Thimithi or otherwise known as the Fire Walking Festival.

Deepavali is the only Hindu religious public holiday in Singapore. The Hindus have also urged the government to make Thaipusam, a former public holiday, to be reinstated as a public holiday as the Christian and Muslim religions have two public holiday each.

Holiday
Before the independence of Singapore in 1965, each religious group was having one to three religious public holidays with both Hindu festivals of Deepavali and Thaipusam as national public holidays.

After the independence of Singapore, each religious group were asked, with the exception of the Buddhist religious group as there was only one Buddhist religious public holiday, to choose a religious public holiday of their own to be removed to reduce the overall number of public holidays in Singapore for Singapore to be competitive in the global market. Thaipusam was chosen to be removed as a public holiday by the Hindus.

After the 1968 amendment of the 1966 Holidays Act, two public holidays were designated each for the Christian (Good Friday and Christmas) and Muslim (Eid al-Fitr and Eid al-Adha) religions while only one public holiday was designated to both the Hindu (Deepavali) and Buddhist (Vesak Day) religions.

Subsequently there were calls from the Hindus to reinstate Thaipusam as a public holiday. In 2015, a petition was launched by educator Sangeetha Thanapal which attracted nearly 20,000 signatures. A rally was also planned in Hong Lim Park but was cancelled by the police.

See also

 Context 
 1915 Singapore Mutiny
 Greater India
 History of Indian influence on Southeast Asia
 History of Singaporean Indians
 Non-resident Indian and Overseas Citizen of India
 Indianisation
 Indian National Army in Singapore
 Hinduism in Southeast Asia

 Indian-origin religions and people in Singapore
 Arya Samaj in Singapore
 Jainism in Singapore
 Indian Singaporeans
 List of Hindu temples in Singapore
 Lists of Hindu temples by country
 List of Indian organisations in Singapore

References

External links
Hindu Endowments Board - Governmental Organisation

 
Hinduism
Indian diaspora in Singapore